Siimurahu is a small uninhabited island in the Baltic Sea belonging to the country of Estonia.

Siimurahu lies off of the western coast of Estonia in the Väinameri Strait, southeast of the island Väike Siimurahu and just off of the Sassi peninsula on the Estonian mainland, covering an area of 4.376 ha, with a circumference of 0.93 km. It is administered by the mainland village of Puise in Ridala Parish, Lääne County.

The island and surrounding area are protected as part of Matsalu National Park.

References

 

Estonian islands in the Baltic
Ridala Parish